Bohot Pyaar Karte Hai was an Indian Hindi-language romantic drama television series that premiered from 5 July 2022 to 10 December 2022 on Star Bharat. Produced by Fazila Allana and Sandiip Sikcand under Sol Production and Sandiip Films, it starred Karan Grover, Sayali Salunkhe and Kiara Sadh.

Plot
The show is about a girl named Indu who lives with her younger sister and parents. Indu loves a guy named Mahesh and wants to go meet him and propose to him for marriage. She goes to meet him with her dad but finds that he has already married someone else. Mahesh insults her and beats her father to which she breaks up with him. While she is returning from there; she meets a pregnant woman on a bus and asks her to come with her. On the bus, the woman delivers her baby and asks Indu to hold her for some time. When Indu wakes she finds out that the woman has left her baby there and ran away. Already trying to overcome her breakup she decides to leave the kid at the station but couldn't and she takes her in. Her mother is against her decision but Indu wants to keep it because the baby was a new hope for her, she names the baby Zoon.

Five years later 
Zoon is five years old now but because of an accident, she can't walk without a leg brace. Zoon wants a father and keeps asking her mother to get her a father and Indu lies to her every time because she doesn't want her to know that she is adopted. Then comes Ritesh Malhotra, a superstar. Zoon likes Ritesh and wants to meet him. On the release of his new film, Ritesh comes to a theatre and saves Zoon when she falls from the second floor of the theatre.

Cast

Main
 Karan Grover as Ritesh Malhotra: Pankaj, Kamna, Deep and Dolly's nephew; Sameer and Vivaan's cousin; Indu's husband; Zoon's adoptive father
 Sayali Salunkhe as Indu Raina Malhotra: Rajendra and Sunita's daughter; Prashant and Anjali's sister; Ritesh's wife; Zoon's adoptive mother
 Kiara Sadh as Zoon Raina Malhotra: Kadambari's biological daughter; Indu and Ritesh's adoptive daughter

Recurring
 Shireen Mirza as Kamna Pankaj Malhotra: Pankaj's second wife; Sameer and Vivan’s maternal aunt/stepmother; Ritesh's aunt 
 Sanjay Swaraj as Pankaj Malhotra: Deep's elder brother; Kamna's husband; Sameer and Vivaan’s father; Ritesh's uncle
 Kushagre Dua as Sameer Malhotra: Pankaj’s son; Kamna’s biological nephew/stepson; Vivaan's elder brother; Ritesh's cousin; Kadambari's husband
 Aryan Arora as Vivan Malhotra: Pankaj’s son; Kamna’s biological nephew/stepson; Sameer's younger brother; Ritesh's cousin; Anjali's lover
 Amit Singh Thakur as Rajendra Raina: Sunita's husband; Prashant, Indu and Anjali's father; Zoon's adoptive grandfather; Asha and Ritesh's father-in-law
 Nikita Tiwari as Asha Bakshi Raina: Nima and Vinod's daughter; Kadambari's step-sister; Prashant's widow; Zoon's adoptive aunt; Vivek's love interest 
 Trishaan Maini as Vivek: Indu's best friend; Asha's lover
 Riya Soni as Anjali "Anju" Raina: Sunita and Rajendra's daughter; Prashant and Indu's sister; Zoon's adoptive aunt; Rahul and Vivaan’s love interest
 Neelam Pathania as Sunita Raina: Rajendra's wife; Prashant, Indu and Anjali's mother; Zoon's adoptive grandmother; Asha and Ritesh's mother-in-law
 Pankit Thakker as Deep Malhotra: Pankaj's younger brother; Dolly's husband; Ritesh, Sameer and Vivaan's uncle
 Priyamvada Singh as Dolly Deep Malhotra: Deep's wife; Ritesh, Sameer and Vivaan's aunt
 Ali Khan as Rahul: Ritesh's friend and manager; Anjali's lover
 Aparna Aparajit as Mrs. Malhotra: Ritesh's mother; Indu's mother-in-law; Zoon's adoptive grandmother
 Prerna Wanvari as Kadambari Patel Malhotra: Vinod's daughter; Asha's step-sister; Zoon's biological mother; Sameer's wife
 Ribbhu Mehra as Mahesh: Indu's former love interest
 Keertida Mistry

Production

Development
The show title is based on the song of the sane name, from the 1991 film Saajan. The series marks second collaboration between Karan Grover and Pankit Thakker after Bahu Hamari Rajni Kant (2016).

Casting 
Sayali Salunkhe was cast as the female lead Indu, a single mother. Karan Grover was cast as the male lead, in the role of a film star.

Filming and release 
Bohot Pyaar Karte Hai's shooting began in June 2022. The first promo arrived the same month, featuring Salunkhe as Indu. The series premiered from 5 July 2022 on Star Bharat.

Awards and nominations

See also
List of programs broadcast by Star Bharat

References

External links 
 Bohot Pyaar Karte Hai on Disney+ Hotstar
 

2022 Indian television series debuts
Hindi-language television shows
Indian drama television series
Indian television soap operas
Star Bharat original programming